The third senatorial elections of the Fifth Republic were held in France on September 26, 1965.

Context 
This election has depended largely of the results of 1965 municipal elections.

Results

Senate Presidency 
On October 2, 1965, Gaston Monnerville was re-elected president of the Senate.

List of senators elected

References 

1965
1965 elections in France